The 2010–11 Bulgarian Cup was the 29th official season of the Bulgarian annual football knockout tournament. The competition began in September 2010 with the matches of the preliminary round and ended the final in May 2011. Beroe Stara Zagora are the defending champions.

The winners of the competition will qualify for the play-off round of the 2011–12 UEFA Europa League.

Participating clubs
The following teams will compete in the cup: (Teams in bold are still active in the competition)

Calendar for remaining rounds
The calendar for the remaining rounds of the 2010–11 Bulgarian Cup, as announced by the BFL.
 Round 1: 27 October 2010 
 Round 2: 20 November 2010
 Round 3: 4 December 2010
 Quarter-finals: 5–7 April 2011
 Semi-finals: 20–21 April 2011
 Final: 25 May 2011

First round 
The draw was conducted on 18 October 2010. The matches will be played on 27 October 2010. On this stage the participants will be the 24 teams from the two second divisions and the 8 winners from the regional amateur competitions. The team from the lower league has home advantage.

Note: Roman numerals in brackets denote the league tier the clubs participate in during the 2010–11 season.

Second round 
The matches will be played on 20 November 2010. On this stage the participants will be the 16 winners from the first round and the 16 teams from A Grupa. The team from the lower league has home advantage.

Note: Roman numerals in brackets denote the league tier the clubs participate in during the 2010–11 season.

Third round 
The matches will be played on 4 December 2010. On this stage the participants will be the 16 winners from the second round. The team from the lower league has home advantage.

Note: Roman numerals in brackets denote the league tier the clubs participate in during the 2010–11 season.

Quarter-finals 
On this stage the participants will be the 8 winners from the third round.

Semi-finals 
On this stage participants will be the 4 winners from the quarterfinals.

Final

See also
 2010–11 A Group
 2010–11 B Group
 2010–11 V AFG

References

Bulgarian Cup seasons
Bulgarian Cup
Cup